Joseph Francis Richard Sévigny (born April 11, 1957) is a Canadian former professional ice hockey goaltender who played for the Montreal Canadiens and Quebec Nordiques in the National Hockey League. He then moved to France to be coach of Chamonix HC (1989–90), Diables Rouges de Briançon (1990–91) and Angers (1994–95), and then returned to the Ligue Nord-Américaine de Hockey. He is noted for being the last Montreal Canadien to wear #33 prior to Patrick Roy.

Playing career
Before making the NHL, Sevigny played for 5 different teams. He spent his junior career in the QMJHL with the Granby Vicks and the Sherbrooke Castors. In 1976, Sevigny was selected to the QMJHL West First All-Star Team by playing in 55 games and posting a 3.85 GAA. His strong play made Team Canada notice him and he was selected to play in the 1976 World Junior Ice Hockey Championships where he won a silver medal. Sevigny's play at the international level caught the attention of the Montreal Canadiens and in 1977, he was selected 124th overall in the 1977 NHL amateur draft. The Canadiens also picked seven other goalies creating some competition to join the roster.

In 1978, Sevigny played for the Kalamazoo Wings in the IHL. He played in 35 games and recorded a 3.01 GAA, good enough to be selected to the Second All-Star Team. He then spent the next season in the AHL, with the Springfield Indians, and the Nova Scotia Voyageurs.

In the 1979 Stanley Cup Finals, Michel Larocque was scheduled to start game two.  Larocque was injured during the pre-game warm up and Sevigny was dressed as a backup in his place. The Canadiens would win that year and Sevigny's name was engraved on the Stanley Cup before ever playing an NHL game.

With Ken Dryden, retiring in the off-season in 1979, spots opened up on the Canadiens roster. Sevigny attended training camp and played well enough to start in eleven regular season games in the 1979-80 season. The following season, he played in 33 games, won 20 of them and had a league best 2.40 GAA. He won the Vezina Trophy along with Denis Herron and Michel Larocque with Montreal that season. On April 20, 1984, Sevigny took part in the "Vendredi Saint" brawl against the Quebec Nordiques. The two benches cleared twice during the game and delayed the game for more than an hour. Sevigny fought the Nordiques' backup goalie Clint Malarchuk and was given a game misconduct.

The next two seasons saw Sevigny post back to back winning records but he was not offered a contract by the Canadiens. They released him and he was quickly picked up by the Quebec Nordiques. He signed a four-year deal and spent the next three seasons with the Nordiques and their AHL affiliate, the Fredericton Express before finishing his career in France in 1990.

Retirement
According to hockey lore, Sevigny was quoted as saying that Guy Lafleur would have Wayne Gretzky in his back pocket during the 1981 playoffs, a quote that motivated the Oilers team to victory over the fabled Habs.
Sevigny has involved himself in old-timers charity hockey games and has coached the semi-pro Verdun Dragons.

Awards and achievements
 Selected to the QMJHL First All-Star Team in 1976.
 Selected to the IHL Second All-Star Team in 1978.
 Stanley Cup championship in 1979.
 Vezina Trophy winner in 1981 (shared with Michel Larocque and Denis Herron).

Career statistics

Regular season and playoffs

International

References

External links

1957 births
Living people
Canadian ice hockey goaltenders
Fredericton Express players
Ice hockey people from Montreal
Montreal Canadiens draft picks
Montreal Canadiens players
Nova Scotia Voyageurs players
Quebec Nordiques players
Sherbrooke Castors players
Springfield Indians players
Stanley Cup champions
Vezina Trophy winners